Jean-Philippe Bolduc is a former professional Canadian football defensive back. He was drafted by the Calgary Stampeders 38th overall in the fifth round of the 2016 CFL Draft and signed with the team on May 23, 2016. He was released as part of final training camp cuts on June 19, 2016 and then signed with the Ottawa Redblacks on June 27, 2016. He won his first Grey Cup championship in his rookie year when the Redblacks defeated the Stampeders in the 104th Grey Cup. He played Canadian Interuniversity Sport football for the Laval Rouge et Or. He retired from football on June 15, 2021.

References

External links 
Ottawa Redblacks bio

1990 births
Living people
Canadian football defensive backs
Laval Rouge et Or football players
Ottawa Redblacks players
Players of Canadian football from Quebec
Canadian football people from Montreal